Vakhtang Kopaleishvili (born 26 December 1954 in Samtredia - died 13 February 2015 in Tbilisi) was a Georgian and Soviet football player and manager. 

Kopaleishvili played for Dinamo Tbilisi and  Guria Lanchkhuti during his career.   

After retirement, Kopaleishvili took charge of Georgia national under-18 football team, which qualified for 1999 UEFA European Under-18 Championship under his management.  

Kopaleishvili died in 2015.

Honours
 Soviet Top League winner: 1978
 Soviet Cup winner: 1976, 1979

References

External links
  Footballfacts Profile

1954 births
2015 deaths
Soviet footballers
Footballers from Georgia (country)
Association football midfielders
FC Dinamo Tbilisi players
Soviet Top League players